Li Jue (1900 – 1987) (李覺) was a Chinese lieutenant-general.

He came from Yunnan, and held several senior posts in the Kuomintang army.

In 1949 he defected to the Maoist People's Liberation Army.

References
Biography of Li Jue

1900 births
1987 deaths
National Revolutionary Army generals from Yunnan
Chinese defectors